
The Wind can refer to:

Poetry and literature
 "The Wind" (poem), a 14th-century poem by Dafydd ap Gwilym
 "The Wind", a 1943 short story by Ray Bradbury appearing in Dark Carnival
 The Wind (novel), a 1925 supernatural novel by Dorothy Scarborough

Films
 The Wind (1928 film), starring Lillian Gish, based on the novel
 The Wind (1934 film), a Chinese silent film
 The Wind (1982 film), a Malian film
 The Wind (1986 film), an American horror film
 The Wind (2018 film), an American western horror film

Music
 The Wind (band)
Der Wind, ballet pantomime composition by Franz Schreker

Albums
 The Wind (Warren Zevon album), a 2003 album by Warren Zevon
 The Wind (Kayhan Kalhor and Erdal Erzincan album), a 2006 album
 The Wind, a 2021 album by Balmorhea

Songs
 "The Wind", a song by Cat Stevens on his 1971 album Teaser and the Firecat
 "The Wind", a song composed by Russ Freeman, originally appeared on the album "Chet Baker & Strings" in 1953. For her 1991 album, Emotions, Mariah Carey wrote her own lyrics for Freeman's composition and sang the tune. 
 "The Wind" (Nolan Strong & The Diablos song)
 "The Wind" (Zac Brown Band song)
 "The Wind", a song by Amos Lee on his 2006 album Supply and Demand
 "The Wind", a song by Demon Hunter on the 2010 Christmas compilation Happy Christmas Vol. 5
 "The Wind", a song by the Fray on their 2012 album Scars & Stories